Upeneichthys is a genus of goatfishes native to the Indian and Pacific coasts of Australia.

Species
There are currently three recognized species in this genus:
 Upeneichthys lineatus Bloch & Schneider, 1801 (Blue-lined goatfish)
 Upeneichthys stotti Hutchins, 1990 (Stott's goatfish)
 Upeneichthys vlamingii (Cuvier, 1829) (Southern goatfish)

Notes

References

 
Perciformes genera
Marine fish genera
Endemic fauna of Australia
Taxa named by Pieter Bleeker